Matthew Sheldon (born August 23, 1992) is an American professional soccer player who currently plays for USL Championship side Hartford Athletic.

Early life
Sheldon was born on 23 August 1992 in Bellevue, Washington, United States. He grew up in Portland, Oregon with his brother, sister and parents. He played recreational soccer until 5th grade, when he joined his first club team. At the time, soccer was just one of many sports that Sheldon played - he played basketball, baseball and American football as well

Sheldon attended Lincoln High School in Portland, Oregon. Alongside high school soccer, he played for Westside Metros Remix club (now known as Westside Timbers).

College career 
During his senior year, Sheldon received athletic scholarships from both UC Davis and Oregon State, as well as a roster spot from Gonzaga. He committed to play for UC Davis.

Club career
Sheldon played college soccer at UC Davis between 2011 and 2014. He spent time in the Premier Development League with San Jose Earthquakes U23 in 2014, Ventura County Fusion in 2015, and briefly with Orange County Blues U-23 in 2016, before moving to Germany with sixth-tier side SG Kinzenbach.

Sheldon signed with United Soccer League club Orange County Blues in July 2016, making his professional debut on July 10, 2016, in a 3–3 draw with Sacramento Republic.

In November 2016, Sheldon announced that he would play for Saint Louis FC for the 2017 USL season.

In March 2018, it was announced Sheldon would play for amateur club side Waterside Karori in Wellington, New Zealand.

On January 14, 2019, the Tulsa Roughnecks FC announced that they had signed Sheldon for their 2019 season.

On December 10, 2019, it was announced that Tulsa, now rebranded as FC Tulsa, had re-signed Sheldon to their roster for the 2020 USL Championship season.

On December 15, 2020, it was announced that FC Tulsa, had re-signed Sheldon to their roster for the 2021 USL Championship season following a successful campaign with the club in 2020.

On December 30, 2021, it was announced that Sheldon had signed a contract with the Charleston Battery ahead of the 2022 USL Championship season. Following the 2022 season, Sheldon was released by Charleston.

On January 31, 2023, Sheldon was announced as a new signing for USL Championship side Hartford Athletic on a one-year deal.

Media
Sheldon also operates two notable YouTube channels called Become Elite as well as the Against All Odds Podcast which combined currently have over 530,000 subscribers. Both channels give a behind the scenes look into the life of a professional soccer player.

References

External links
 
 

1992 births
Living people
American soccer players
American expatriate soccer players
Association football defenders
Charleston Battery players
Hartford Athletic players
Orange County SC players
Saint Louis FC players
San Jose Earthquakes U23 players
Soccer players from Portland, Oregon
Sportspeople from Bellevue, Washington
FC Tulsa players
UC Davis Aggies men's soccer players
USL Championship players
USL League Two players
Ventura County Fusion players
Waterside Karori players
Expatriate association footballers in New Zealand
American expatriate sportspeople in New Zealand
American expatriate soccer players in Germany
American YouTubers